Stig-Göran Johansson (July 18, 1943 – April 20, 2002) was a Swedish professional ice hockey player.

He competed as a member of the Sweden men's national ice hockey team at the 1972 Winter Olympics held in Japan.

On May 17, 2012, Stig-Göranson was elected into the Swedish Hockey Hall of Fame.

References

External links

1943 births
2002 deaths
Ice hockey players at the 1972 Winter Olympics
Olympic ice hockey players of Sweden
People from Surahammar Municipality
Södertälje SK players
Swedish ice hockey right wingers
Sportspeople from Västmanland County